Bueng Na Rang is a district (amphoe) in the western part of Phichit province, central Thailand.

Geography
Neighboring districts are (from the north clockwise) Pho Prathap Chang, Taphan Hin and Pho Thale of Phichit Province, Banphot Phisai of Nakhon Sawan province and Bueng Samakkhi of Kamphaeng Phet province.

History
The minor district was established on 15 July 1996 by splitting off five tambon from Pho Thale district.

The Thai government on 15 May 2007 upgraded all 81 minor districts to full districts. With publication in the Royal Gazette on 24 August the upgrade became official
.

Administration
The district is divided into five sub-districts (tambon), which are further subdivided into 50 villages (muban). There are no municipal (thesaban) areas, and five tambon administrative organizations (TAO).

References

External links
amphoe.com

Bueng Na Rang